Warten is a village in the municipality of Leeuwarden in the province of Friesland, the Netherlands. It had a population of around 915 in January 2017.

There is a restored windmill in the village, De Ikkers. Warten is close to the De Alde Feanen National Park.

Warten is the hometown of Olympic gold medallist Marit Bouwmeester (2016: Laser Radial sailing).

History
The village was first mentioned in 1412 as Wartena. The etymology is unknown. Warten was originally a terp (artificial living mound) village in the early middle ages. Later, it developed into a canal village. The Dutch Reformed church was built in 1780 as a replacement of the medieval church. The tower was restored in 1880. The Oud Friese Greidboerderij is an old Frisian long house farm which was built around 1728 on a terp. It is one of the few remaining farms which is still in original condition.

The polder mill De Ikkers originated from the 18th century. In 1921, it was purchased and moved to Snikzwaag to remove excess water from the Broeksterpolder. In 1970, it was bought and moved to Warten and restored, however it is not in service.

In 1840, Warten was home to 461 people. Until 2014, Warten was part of Boarnsterhim municipality and until 1984 it belonged to Idaarderadeel.

Notable people 
 Marit Bouwmeester (born 1988), sailor

Gallery

References

External links

Leeuwarden
Populated places in Friesland